Reynaldo Felipe Pineda García (born 6 August 1978) is a Honduran footballer.

He was a member of the Honduran squad that competed at the 2001 Copa America and the 1999 Panamerican Games in Winnipeg.

Club career
Nicknamed el Chino, Pineda played at Independiente Villela where Chelato Uclés made him debut at his 15 years against Olimpia. He also played for Deportes Savio for whom he still was their third-placed goalscorer by 2009.

He later moved on to Real España where he was going to sign for 5 years more but Club Deportivo Victoria made him a good offer. He passed to Victoria but he had bad relations with the chairman and later left football. He returned and started playing in Liga de Ascenso de Honduras.

In 2009, he won the second division league title with Atletico Gualala.

International career
Pineda made his debut for Honduras in a November 2000 FIFA World Cup qualification match against St Vincent & the Grenadines and has earned a total of 4 caps, scoring no goals. He has represented his country in 1 FIFA World Cup qualification match and played at the 2001 Copa América.

His final international was a July 2001 Copa América match against Uruguay.

References

External links

1978 births
Living people
People from San Pedro Sula
Association football midfielders
Honduran footballers
Honduras international footballers
Liga Nacional de Fútbol Profesional de Honduras players
2001 Copa América players
Independiente Villela players
Deportes Savio players
C.D. Victoria players
Real C.D. España players